Michael Christie (June 25, 1969 – April 22, 2004) was an American professional golfer who played on the PGA Tour, Nationwide Tour and NGA Hooters Tour.

Christie was born in Greenville, South Carolina. He was an All-American at the University of South Carolina in 1992. Christie got his start in professional golf in 1993 by qualifying for the U.S. Open, where he finished T-52. He won his first pro tournament on the then Nike Tour at the Carolina Classic in Raleigh, North Carolina in 1995 by shooting a tournament record of 22-under-par. He played on the Nike Tour from 1994 to 1996 winning four times and earned his PGA Tour card as a result of his three victories in 1996, finishing second Stewart Cink on the money list. Christie played on the PGA Tour from 1997 to 2000; his best finish was a tie for sixth at the Greater Vancouver Open in 1997.

Christie began experiencing debilitating physical ailments beginning in 1998 which curtailed his golfing career. Through several surgeries, he attempted comebacks to the professional ranks through 2003. Christie died of a self-inflicted wound at the age of 34.

In addition to his successes on the PGA and Nationwide Tours, Christie won twice on the Hooters Tour. His teammates at the University of South Carolina included current pros Carl Paulson and Brett Quigley.

Professional wins (6)

Nike Tour wins (4)

Other wins (2)
2 wins on the NGA Hooters Tour

Results in major championships

"T" = tied
Note: Christie only played in the U.S. Open.

See also
1996 Nike Tour graduates
List of golfers with most Web.com Tour wins

References

External links

American male golfers
South Carolina Gamecocks men's golfers
PGA Tour golfers
Korn Ferry Tour graduates
Golfers from South Carolina
Sportspeople from Greenville, South Carolina
Suicides by firearm in South Carolina
2004 suicides
1969 births
2004 deaths